Sandra Boutilier Fyfe  was installed as the Bishop of the Nova Scotia and Prince Edward Island, Canada on 30 November (Saint Andrew's Day), 2020.

Fyfe began her post-secondary education in 1985 and completed the Foundation Year Program at University of King's College, before going on to obtain a degree in public relations from Mount Saint Vincent University and working in that field for several years. She later earned an M.Div from Memorial University of Newfoundland and was ordained as a deacon in 2000 and as a priest in 2001. She has served as curate at St. Thomas Church in St. John's, rector at Christ Church in Shelburne and priest in charge of the parishes of St. James Church in Kentville and Lockeport-Barrington. In 2009 she became the rector of the Parish of Horton, St. John’s Church, Wolfville. She was archdeacon of the South Shore region until 2009 and archdeacon of the Valley region until 2017.  
 
She was elected to the episcopacy on September 12, 2020 during a vacancy of see following Bishop Ronald Cutler's retirement in the midst of the COVID-19 pandemic. Due to strict Public Health restrictions no congregation was permitted to gather for her consecration, but just over 4,000 joined to watch the live broadcast.

References

Anglican bishops of Nova Scotia and Prince Edward Island
Memorial University of Newfoundland alumni
Saint Mary's University (Halifax) alumni
University of King's College alumni
Living people
Year of birth missing (living people)